These page shows the results for the 63rd edition of the Gent–Wevelgem cycling classic over 214 kilometres, held on Wednesday, April 11, 2001. There were a total number of 187 competitors, with 72 of them finishing the race, which was won by the United States' George Hincapie.

Final classification

References

External links
Official race website

Gent–Wevelgem
2001 in road cycling
2001 in Belgian sport
April 2001 sports events in Europe